Så som i himmelen is a 2018 musical with music and lyrics by Carin Pollak and Fredrik Kempe and book by Kay Pollak, Edward af Sillen and Carin Pollak. The story is based on the 2004 Swedish movie As It Is in Heaven by Kay Pollak. It tells the story of Daniel Daréus, a successful and world renowned conductor whose life aspiration is to create music that will open people's hearts. After suffering heart attack, he travels back to his hometown of Norrland in the far north of Sweden. Though resistant at first, he begins working with the local choir. They in return help him fix his outlook on life through community spirit and the love of music.

Så som i himmelen premiered at the Oscarsteatern in Stockholm, opening to five star reviews. The original cast starred Philip Jalmelid as Daniel, Malena Ernman as Gabriella, Björn Kjellman as Arne, Anders Ekborg as Stig and Tuva B Larsen as Lena. Productions have also been staged in Norway Finland, Austria and Iceland.

Production history

Stockholm (2018–20) 
Så som i himmelen had its premier on the 13th of September 2018 in Stockholm's Oscarsteatern. The limited run was extended multiple times, through to 2020.

Oslo (2020) 
The first international production of Så som i himmelen had its premier at the Oslo Nye Teater on the 30th of January 2020 but closed due to COVID-91, then returned on the 8th of April 2022. A Norwegian tour by the Oslo production then took place, stopping in Bergen, Skien, Kristiansand, Tønsberg, Trondheim, Lillestrøm, Lillehammer and Stavanger before returning to Oslo Nye Teater in 2023.

Mo i Rana (2021) 
On the 13th February 2021, Nordland Teater premiered their own Northern Norwegian version of Så som i himmelen. Making it the 2nd Norwegian production, but the 1st in Nordland and Nordland Teater's biggest production ever. Their production went on tour visiting Tromsø, Finnsnes, Harstad, Sortland, Svolvær, Leknes, Narvik, Bodø, Mosjøen and Sandnessjøen.

Helsinki (2021) 
Titled Niin kuin taivaassa, the musical opened in the Helsingin Kaupunginteatteri on the 26th of August 2021.

Linz (2021) 
Austria debuted the original German translation of the musical Wie im Himmel in the Landestheater in Linz on the 11th of September 2021.

Malmö (2022) 
A brand new Swedish cast took to the Malmö Opera stage from the 30th of April 2022.

Gothenburg (2022) 
The entire original Stockholm cast were meant to take the musical to The Theater Gothia Towers in 2020, but this was postponed due to COVID-19. Instead the Gothenburg production ran in the Scandinavium instead from 27 May to 5 June 2022.

Reykjavík (2022) 
An Icelandic translation of the musical opened on the 16th of September 2022 in the National Theatre of Iceland titled Sem á himni.

Other Notable Productions 
At the end of the Stockholm run, to celebrate its success, the full original cast performed a series of concerts under the title En himmelsk musikalkonsert. Two in Skansen and one Dalhalla in Rättvik. It featured songs from the musical, as well as songs from Broadway and West End shows.

SäffleOperan were the first semi-professional house in the world to premiere Så som i himmelen in Sweden on the 1st of October 2022. Andreas Hoff played Daniel, after also performing the role in Nordland Teater's production in Norway. Rikard Björk also reprised his role of Tore from the original Stockholm cast.

Germany's 1st production of Wie im Himmel will also be the musical's fully no-profit amateur debut, and will premier on the 10th of November 2022 in Rheda-Wiedenbrück by Musical-Fabrik.

Casts
The principal original casts of the major productions of Så som i himmelen.

Musical numbers

Act I 
 "Prologue"
 "Den tid jag har" - Daniel
 "Man vet aldrig när det händer"
 "Fråga Arne" - Arne and Ensemble
 "Stilla natt/De berör mig"
 "Mycket som är fint"
 "Du är aldrig ensam"
 "Körövningarna"
 "Säg aldrig nej till Gud"
 "58 sekunder"
 "Härlig är jorden"
 "Lena och Tores vals"
 "Gabriellas sång" - Gabriella

Act II 
 "Entr'acte"
 "Vi gjorde succé"
 "En sång till livet" - Gabriella, Lena and Ensemble
 "Alla ord om synd" - Inger
 "Änglasång" - Lena
 "Stjärnorna" - Gabriella and Ensemble
 "Hur tro du att det känns" - Stig
 "Reser fast jag inte vill" - Daniel
 "På grund av dig" - Daniel and Lena
 "Det vi är ska aldrig dö"
 "Så som i himmelen"
 "Tonerna" - Ensemble

Recordings 
The Original Stockholm Cast recording was released on the 7th of December 2018 by Playground Music.
It was recorded in the studio of Benny Andersson from ABBA.

Tracklist
 Så som i Himmelen - Daniel Migdal - 4:46	
 Den tid jag har - Philip Jalmelid - 4:18	
 Fråga Arne - Björn Kjellman & Så som i Himmelen Ensemblen - 2:38	
 Gabriellas sång - Malena Ernman & Så som i Himmelen Ensemblen - 3:36	
 En sång till livet  - Tuva B Larsen, Malena Ernman & Så som i Himmelen Ensemblen - 3:01	
 Alla ord om synd - Sara Jangfeldt - 3:54	
 Änglasång - Tuva B Larsen - 3:07	
 Stjärnorna - Malena Ernman & Så som i Himmelen Ensemblen - 3:24	
 Hur tror du att det känns - Anders Ekborg - 3:08	
 Reser fast jag inte vill - Philip Jalmelid - 2:33	
 På grund av dig - Philip Jalmelid & Tuva B Larsen - 3:19	
 Så som i Himmelen - Ensemblen - 2:30

Oslo Nye Teater released their cast recording on the 17th of March 2020.

Tracklist
 Den Tid Jeg Har - 3:57	
 Man Vet Aldri Når Det Hender - 1:45	
 Snakk Med Arne - 3:05	
 Du Er Aldri Alene - 2:49	
 Gabriellas Sang - 3:36	
 En Sang til Livet - 2:49	
 Alle Ord om Synd - 3:15	
 Englesang - 2:43	
 Hva Tror Du at Jeg Føler Nå - 3:19	
 Drar Selv om Jeg Ikke Vil - 2:22	
 På Grunn av Deg - 4:03	
 Så som i Himmelen - 2:06

3 tracks from the Nordland Teater production were released on the 5th of March 2021.

Tracklist
 Gabriellas sang - Christine Guldbrandsen - 3:33	
 Den tid æ har - Andreas Hoff - 4:17	
 På grunn av dæ - Karoline Dons & Andreas Hoff - 3:18

References

External links

 Official website
 Stockholm Cast Recording
 Oslo Cast Recording
 Nordland Teater Cast Recording

Swedish musicals
2018 musicals
Musicals based on films